Alexa Suelzer  (June 19, 1918 – June 26, 2015) was an American author, educator and theologian known for her Old Testament criticism. A Roman Catholic religious sister, she was a member of the Sisters of Providence of Saint Mary-of-the-Woods, Indiana. One of her most cited works is her essay "Modern Old Testament Criticism" in The New Jerome Biblical Commentary. In addition to her writing, she taught for twenty years at Saint Mary-of-the-Woods College.

Early life
She was born on June 19, 1918, in Fort Wayne, Indiana. She entered religious life on February 14, 1938. Two of her natural sisters had already become sisters as well (Sister Mary Josephine and Sister David). Suelzer became a fully professed Sister on August 15, 1946.

Career
Suelzer earned a bachelor's degree in English at Saint Mary-of-the-Woods College and then taught high school for fourteen years. By utilizing summer sessions, she completed a master's degree in English at Marquette University in 1956. That year she was selected to study at the Regina Mundi institute in Rome.

In 1958, Suelzer was sent to study for a doctorate in Sacred Doctrine at The Catholic University of America in Washington, D.C. This was at "a time during which ... few women were encouraged to pursue study in the specialized field of scripture." New approaches to scriptural religious studies were being developed in those years that were seen by many bishops as controversial. Suelzer's advisor Father Gerald Sloyan suggested she avoid unwanted criticism by giving her visionary dissertation a more traditional, pedagogical title, "The Utilization of the Pentateuch in the Teaching of College Scripture." Suelzer completed her PhD in 1962; two years later her dissertation was published by Herder and Herder as The Pentateuch: A Study in Salvation History.

Suelzer's theological understanding became even more important to the Sisters of Providence after the church changes of the Second Vatican Council. She was active in the theological formation of new sisters. In 1964 she presented at the annual conference for the Conference of Major Superiors of Women (CMSW).

In later years, in addition to teaching theology at Saint Mary-of-the-Woods College for many years, Suelzer led retreats and spoken on the subject of prayer and scriptures. She was part of a committee to look into the case of Michigan Sister of Mercy Agnes Mary Mansour, who controversially refused to resign her position as the state's Director of Social Services though the State provided abortion services. Suelzer also participated in the Brookland Commission, an inquiry beginning in 1988 into the place of intellectual life among communities of women religious.

Suelzer continued to write and teach in her later years, teaching in the Masters of Pastoral Theology program at Saint Mary-of-the-Woods College well into her eighties and contributing to Sisters of Providence publications regularly into her nineties. She died at Saint Mary-of-the-Woods on June 26, 2015.

Works
 "The Utilization of the Theme of Salvation History in the Teaching of College Sacred Doctrine" (1962)
 The Pentateuch: A Study in Salvation History (1964)
 "Modern Old Testament Criticism." In Brown, Raymond E., ed. The New Jerome Biblical Commentary (first publication 1968)
 "Ecclesial relationships for religious: desires and limits" (in Reviews for Religious, Jul/Aug 1984)

References

1918 births
20th-century American Roman Catholic theologians
Women Christian theologians
Sisters of Providence of Saint Mary-of-the-Woods
Marquette University alumni
Catholic University of America alumni
American biblical scholars
Old Testament scholars
Roman Catholic biblical scholars
Writers from Fort Wayne, Indiana
Saint Mary-of-the-Woods College alumni
Women religious writers
2015 deaths
20th-century American women writers
American women non-fiction writers
20th-century American non-fiction writers
20th-century American Roman Catholic nuns
Catholics from Indiana
Female biblical scholars
21st-century American Roman Catholic nuns